Metagnoma is a genus of longhorn beetles of the subfamily Lamiinae, containing the following species:

 Metagnoma singularis Aurivillius, 1925
 Metagnoma strandi Breuning, 1943

References

Pteropliini